The 1962 Brussels Grand Prix was a motor race run for cars complying with Formula One rules, held on 1 April 1962 at Heysel Park, Belgium. The race was run in three heats of 22 laps each and the results were aggregated. The race was won by Belgian driver Willy Mairesse in a Ferrari 156. The course was somewhat altered over previous years, as part of the area that had held spectators was now in commercial use. This was the debut for BRM's new V8 engine, as well as the first race for the upgraded Coventry-Climax V8 used in Jim Clark's Lotus.

Qualifying

1Vaccarella was 'bumped' to make way for the invited home-country drivers Pilette and Bianchi
2car burnt out in practice accident
3entry taken by Campbell-Jones

Results

Conventional Aggregate

Official Aggregate

References

http://www.silhouet.com/motorsport/archive/f1/nc/1962/1962.html#bru
http://www.formula2.net/F162_3.htm

Brussels Grand Prix